Boniface Choi Ki-san (16 May 1948 – 30 May 2016) was a South Korean Roman Catholic bishop.

Choi was born in Gimpo, and graduated from the Catholic University of Korea's School of Theology. Ordained to the priesthood in 1975, Choi served as coadjutor bishop of the Roman Catholic Diocese of Incheon, South Korea from 1999 to 2002 and bishop of the diocese from 2002 until his death in 2016.

Notes

1948 births
2016 deaths
Catholic University of Korea alumni
People from Gimpo
South Korean Roman Catholic bishops
Roman Catholic bishops of Incheon